Ruymán Jesús Hernández Perera (born 15 October 1986 in Arucas, Las Palmas, Gran Canaria), known simply as Ruymán, is a Spanish professional footballer who plays as a central defender for Arucas CF.

External links

1986 births
Living people
People from Arucas, Las Palmas
Sportspeople from the Province of Las Palmas
Spanish footballers
Footballers from the Canary Islands
Association football defenders
Segunda División players
Segunda División B players
Tercera División players
Tercera Federación players
UD Las Palmas Atlético players
UD Las Palmas players
UD Vecindario players
Racing de Santander players
Recreativo de Huelva players
UE Costa Brava players
CD Mirandés footballers
Botola players
Chabab Rif Al Hoceima players
Spanish expatriate footballers
Expatriate footballers in Morocco
Spanish expatriate sportspeople in Morocco